Khan Shaykhun Subdistrict  is a Syrian nahiyah (subdistrict) located in Ma'arrat al-Nu'man District in Idlib.  According to the Syria Central Bureau of Statistics (CBS), Khan Shaykhun Subdistrict had a population of 50469 in the 2004 census.

References 

Subdistricts of Idlib Governorate